Prakash Sonkar (15 January 1954 – 23 June 2007) was an Indian politician. He was member of the Bharatiya Janata Party. Sonkar was a member of the Madhya Pradesh Legislative Assembly from the Sanwer constituency in Indore district in 1980, 1990 and 2003. He was Minister of State for Forest and Scheduled Caste Welfare in Government of Madhya Pradesh from 2005 to 2007.
He died on 23 June, 2007.

References 

People from Indore district
Bharatiya Janata Party politicians from Madhya Pradesh
Madhya Pradesh MLAs 1980–1985
Madhya Pradesh MLAs 1990–1992
Madhya Pradesh MLAs 1993–1998
Madhya Pradesh MLAs 2003–2008
1954 births
2007 deaths